The Henri River (in French: rivière Henri) is a tributary of the east bank of the rivière du Chêne which empties on the south shore of the St. Lawrence River. The Henri River flows through the municipalities of Saint-Gilles, Sainte-Agathe-de-Lotbinière, Dosquet, Saint-Janvier-de-Joly, Val-Alain and Leclercville, in the Lotbinière Regional County Municipality, in the administrative region of Chaudière-Appalaches, in Quebec, in Canada.

Geography 

The main neighboring watersheds of the Henri River are:
 north side: Aulneuse River, rivière aux Cèdres, rivière aux Frênes, Huron River, Noire River (Huron River tributary), St. Lawrence River;
 east side: Jean-Houde River, Beaurivage River, Rouge River, Noire River, Saint-Georges River;
 south side: rivière du Chêne, Armagh River;
 west side: rivière du Chêne.

The Henri River takes its source on the west side of a marsh area in a forest zone in the southern part of the municipality of Saint-Gilles. This head zone is located on the west side of a marsh zone at the limit of Saint-Gilles and Saint-Patrice-de-Beaurivage.

Upper course of the Henri River (segment of )

From its source, the Henri River flows over  divided into the following segments:
  north-west, crossing the boundary between Saint-Gilles and Sainte-Agathe-de-Lotbinière, until at route 218;
  west, then north, in Sainte-Agathe-de-Lotbinière, to the same limit of Saint-Gilles;
  towards the northeast, in Saint-Gilles;
  westward, up to the limit between Saint-Gilles and Dosquet;
  northwesterly, up to the confluence of Perron stream;

Lower part of the Henri River (segment of )

From route 116, the Henri river flows over:
  westward, up to the limit between Dosquet and Joly;
  west, up to a road of ranges 1 and 2;
  towards the north-west, to the limit between Joly and Val-Alain;
  northwesterly, to highway 20;
  (or  towards the northeast) winding up to the limit between Val-Alain and Leclercville (sector of "Sainte-Emmélie")

The Henri river empties on the east bank of the rivière du Chêne in the locality "Les Trois-Fourches".

Toponymy 
The toponym Rivière Henri was formalized on December 5, 1968, at the Commission de toponymie du Québec.

Gallery

See also 

 List of rivers of Quebec

References 

Rivers of Chaudière-Appalaches
Lotbinière Regional County Municipality